San Antonio Dam (National ID CA00813) is an earthen dam on the San Antonio River in Monterey County, California in the United States.

History
San Antonio Dam was completed in 1965.

Access
The dam is accessible from Exit 252 of U.S. Route 101 by taking Jolon Road to Nacimiento Lake Drive to Vista Road.

Operations

Water released from San Antonio Dam travels down the San Antonio River to join the Salinas River on its way to Monterey Bay.

Nomenclature
Another dam with the same name is located on San Antonio Creek in San Bernardino County, California.

See also
List of largest reservoirs of California
List of reservoirs and dams in California

References

External links
 Monterey County Parks: Lake San Antonio Park

Dams in California
Buildings and structures in Monterey County, California
Dams completed in 1965
Salinas River (California)
Santa Lucia Range